Rhadinaea gaigeae is a species of snake in the family Colubridae. The species is endemic to Mexico.

Etymology
The specific name, gaigeae, is in honor of American herpetologist Helen Beulah Thompson Gaige.

Geographic range
R. gaigeae is found in the Mexican states of Durango, Hidalgo, Querétaro, San Luis Potosí, and Tamaulipas.

References

Further reading
Bailey JR (1937). "A New Species of Rhadinaea from San Luis Potosí ". Copeia 1937 (2): 118–119. (Rhadinaea gaigeae, new species).

Reptiles described in 1937
Colubrids
Reptiles of Mexico